Judiciary of Ireland may refer to:
Courts of Northern Ireland
Courts of the Republic of Ireland